Aslan (born Alain Gourdon), (23 May 1930; Bordeaux, France – 11 February 2014; Sainte-Adèle, Quebec, Canada) was a French painter, sculptor and pin-up artist. He is mostly known in France for his pin ups. He contributed to Lui from the creation of the magazine in 1964 to the early eighties, providing a monthly pin up.

He is the sculptor of the Dalida's funerary statue on her tomb from 1987, and her bronze bust that was erected on Place Dalida in 1997. He also sculpted the Fifth Republic Marianne as Brigitte Bardot in 1970, followed by the Mireille Mathieu Marianne.

References

External links

1930 births
2014 deaths
Pin-up artists
French illustrators
French sculptors
French male sculptors
French erotic artists
Artists from Bordeaux